The 2010 European Cross Country Championships was a continental cross country running competition that took place on 12 December in Albufeira, Portugal. It was the second time that the country hosted the event, building upon the 1997 edition held in Oeiras.

Serhiy Lebid won the men's race for his ninth victory of the championship – a record for the competition. France took the men's team title. Jessica Augusto comprehensively won the women's race for the host nation and also led the Portuguese team to a team gold medal. At total of 468 athletes from a record number of 34 nations competed at the event.

Competition

Preparation
The race took place on a purpose-built course near the city, which also hosts the annual Almond Blossom Cross Country. Albufeira was chosen as the host at the 120th European Athletics Council Meeting in October 2008, defeating a rival bid from Velenje (which was chosen for the 2011 edition instead).

Hayley Yelling entered the race as the defending women's champion while Alemayehu Bezabeh, the reigning men's champion, did not take part in the competition. High-profile investigations into doping in Spain immediately preceded the championships and Bezabeh was among the athletes implicated in Operación Galgo. As both the reigning champion and the 2009 silver medallist Mo Farah were absent, the men's race was seen as a relatively open competition, with Ukrainian Serhiy Lebid, Spanish runners Ayad Lamdassem and Jesús España being the foremost protagonists. The withdrawal of Rosa Morató (runner-up in 2009) left Jessica Augusto as the provisional favourite for the women's race. Forming a strong team, three other Portuguese runners (Ana Dulce Félix, Marisa Barros and Sara Moreira) were expected to challenge for medals, as were Yelling and Adriënne Herzog (also directly implicated in Operación Galgo), who was third the previous year.

Races

The men's race remained relatively tight until the final lap. Six men were on equal footing at the bell: Lebid, Lamdassem, French duo Morhad Amdouni and Abdellatif Meftah, and Rui Pedro Silva and Yousef El Kalai, both representing the hosts. Lamdassem was the first to move away from the pack, seizing the lead, and only Lebid followed. The Ukrainian overhauled Lamdassem in the final stages and maintained a clear lead to win his ninth title – a record for the competition. Lamdassem just held off a late sprint from El Kalai to take the runner-up spot. Meftah and Amdouni finished shortly after for fourth and fifth, leading the French men to a team victory.

Jessica Augusto made her gold medal intentions known as she took the lead in the opening stages. The Portuguese athlete never relinquished the position and produced a largely unrivalled, solo performance. Spaniard Alessandra Aguilar shadowed her in the middle part of the race but later dropped out of contention. With Augusto clear in front, Binnaz Uslu, Ana Dulce Félix, Fionnuala Britton and Tetyana Holovchenko battled for the minor medals in the second half of the race. Félix and Uslu fought for the runner-up spot with the Turk eventually winning out. Augusto's lead was so significant that she slowed and celebrated throughout the home straight, still crossing the line with a five-second advantage. Félix took the bronze just ahead Britton, helping the Portuguese women to the team gold medal, and Holovchenko rounded out the top five.

Hassan Chahdi of France took the men's under-23 title while Ethiopian-born Meryem Erdoğan won the women's under-23 section for Turkey. The junior races were won by Abdelaziz Merzougui and Charlotte Purdue.

Race results

Senior men

Totals: 75 entrants, 74 starters, 71 finishers, 10 teams.

Senior women

Totals: 49 entrants, 49 starters, 47 finishers, 7 teams.

Under-23 men

Totals: 102 entrants, 102 starters, 96 finishers, 16 teams.

Under-23 women

Totals: 65 entrants, 64 starters, 61 finishers, 8 teams.

Junior men

Totals: 104 entrants, 104 starters, 99 finishers, 17 teams.

Junior women

Totals: 76 entrants, 75 starters, 74 finishers, 11 teams.

Total medal table

Note: Totals include both individual and team medals, with medals in the team competition counting as one medal.

References

External links
Official website
Competition site on European Athletics

European Cross Country Championships
European Cross Country Championships
Race
2010 in Portuguese sport
Sport in Albufeira
Cross country running in Portugal
December 2010 sports events in Europe